Grünwinkel is a borough in the southwest of Karlsruhe, Baden-Württemberg, in the southwest of Germany.

History 
There are archeological traces of a brickyard from the 1st century. Written information dates from the 15th century, when the name was Kreenwinkel, which can be read as crow corner. Today's name means green corner.

References

External links 
 Grünwinkel in the City Wiki
 municipal information

Karlsruhe
Boroughs of Karlsruhe